VEF Rīga may refer to:
BK VEF Rīga, a Latvian basketball team
FK VEF Rīga, a defunct Latvian football team